Edmund Carroll (22 October 1886 – 6 June 1959) was an Australian cricketer. He played four first-class cricket matches for Victoria in 1912.

See also
 List of Victoria first-class cricketers

References

External links
 

1886 births
1959 deaths
Australian cricketers
Victoria cricketers
Cricketers from Melbourne